Lilian de Geus (born 13 October 1991) is a Dutch sailor. She represented her country at the 2016 Summer Olympics in the RS:X windsurfer, achieving 4th place overall.

References

External links
 
 
 
 

1991 births
Living people
Dutch female sailors (sport)
Olympic sailors of the Netherlands
Sailors at the 2016 Summer Olympics – RS:X
Sailors at the 2020 Summer Olympics – RS:X
RS:X class world champions
20th-century Dutch women
21st-century Dutch women
Dutch windsurfers
Female windsurfers